The National Museum of Science and Technology, Lahore (NMST) is a museum in  Lahore, Pakistan.

The museum was founded in 1965 and is a non-profit, permanent institution in the service of society, open to the public, which exhibits the tangible and intangible heritage of humanity and its environment for the purpose of education of the public.

Since its establishment in 1965, the National Museum of Science and Technology has served as Pakistan's only national-level science and technology museum. Initially it was meant only for the University of Engineering & Technology students. Later in 1976, it was opened to the public. In a spirit of service to the public, this museum has continually improved and enhanced its functions as a museum of science and technology. Exhibits and its galleries went through four phases of expansion. The Museum became an attached department of Science and Education Department, Punjab in the wake of the 18th amendment to the Constitution of Pakistan in 2011. In 2011, this museum in Lahore had nearly 100,000 visitors.

Science awareness among students
Science awareness leads to research, inquiry and generation of new ideas among students. Occasionally some healthy competitions are arranged at the museum for the students. Annual essay writing, science quiz and science innovation competitions are also held.

Museum location
This Science & Technology museum is situated on G.T. Road, near the University of Engineering & Technology, Lahore (UET).

See also
List of museums in Pakistan

References

External links

Science museums in Pakistan
Tourist attractions in Lahore
Government of Punjab, Pakistan